The Dawn Maker is a lost 1916 silent film western directed by and starring William S. Hart and produced by Thomas H. Ince. Triangle Pictures distributed.

Cast
 William S. Hart - Joe Elk
 Blanche White - Alice McRae
 William Desmond - Bruce Smithson
 J. Frank Burke - Walter McRae
 Joy Goodboy - Chief Troubled Thunder

References

External links
 
 AllMovie;synopsis
 colorful lobby poster

1916 films
1916 Western (genre) films
Lost Western (genre) films
Lost American films
American black-and-white films
1916 lost films
Silent American Western (genre) films
Films directed by William S. Hart
1910s American films
1910s English-language films